Persoonia recedens is a species of flowering plant in the family Proteaceae and is endemic to a restricted area of New South Wales. It is a spreading to low-lying shrub with hairy young branchlets, narrow oblong to narrow elliptic leaves, and yellow flowers borne in groups of up to twelve on a rachis up to  that continues to grow after flowering.

Description
Flowering occurs from December to January.

Taxonomy
Persoonia recedens was first formally described in 1919 by Michel Gandoger in the Bulletin de la Société Botanique de France from specimens collected by Carl Walter near Blackheath in 1882.

Distribution and habitat
This geebung grows in forest on sandstone between the Newnes Plateau and Blackheath in New South Wales.

References

recedens
Flora of New South Wales
Plants described in 1919
Taxa named by Michel Gandoger